Jackson's Bay Cave is a very large cave on the Portland Ridge in Clarendon near the south coast of Jamaica. It is considered to be one of the most beautiful in the Caribbean. It was discovered in 1964. It is part of the Jackson bay cave system, consisting of 14 unconnected caves, and over 9200m of cumulated caves passages mapped since then.

History
Pottery shards, rock carvings and rock paintings suggest that the caves were used by the Arawak Indians or Taínos.

Fossils
A specimen of the extinct Jamaican monkey (Xenothrix mcgregori) was found by an American Museum of Natural History expedition c. 1993–1996.  Fossil remains of the Jamaican flightless ibis (Xenicibis xympithecus) and the Jamaican caracara (Caracara tellustris) have also been found there.

See also
 List of caves in Jamaica
 Jamaican Caves Organisation
 The Caves of Portland Ridge - 2020 (pdf)

References

External links
Aerial view.

Caves of Jamaica
Geography of Clarendon Parish, Jamaica
Paleontological sites of the Caribbean
Caves of the Caribbean